The 2004 West Lancashire District Council election took place on 10 June 2004 to elect members of  West Lancashire District Council in Lancashire, England. One third of the council was up for election and the Conservative Party stayed in overall control of the council.

After the election, the composition of the council was:

Campaign
Before the election the Conservatives held 28 seats compared to 26 for Labour. 18 seats were contested in the election, with 9 seats being defended by each of the 2 parties. As well as candidates from the Conservative and Labour parties, there were also 7 independents, 4 Greens, 1 Liberal Democrat and 1 from the new Ormskirk party. Both the Liberal Democrat and Ormskirk party candidates were standing in Derby ward, which was seen as being one of the critical contests in the election.

A major issue in the election was privatisation, which the Conservatives supported saying it would improve efficiency, however Labour criticised the Conservatives plans saying investment should be kept in the area. The Conservatives called on voters to back their moves to establish litter free zones, create secure leisure facilities for young people and refurbish parks. However Labour attacked plans to sell council housing and the handing of a local park to a private developer. Other issues included crime, anti-social behaviour, CCTV and plans to move the accident and emergency department of  Ormskirk hospital to Southport hospital.

Election result
The results saw the Conservatives hold on to control of the council after making 1 gain from Labour. This meant the Conservatives held 29 seats compared to 25 for Labour and the election was described as a "vindication of Conservative policies running West Lancs" by the Conservative leader of the council, Geoff Roberts. Meanwhile, Labour's group leader on the council, Alan Bullen, only narrowly held his own seat on the council in Skelmersdale North. Overall turnout in the election was up by 14% at 42.47%.

Ward results

Ashurst

Aughton and Downholland

Birch Green

Burscough

Burscough West

Derby

Digmoor

Halsall

Hesketh-with-Becconsall

Knowsley

Moorside

Rufford

Scott

Skelmersdale North

Skelmersdale South

Tarleton

Up Holland

Wrightington

References

2004
2004 English local elections
2000s in Lancashire